Marianne Hold (15 May 1933 – 11 September 1994) was a German movie actress who became popular in the 1950s and 1960s for her numerous roles in the Heimatfilm genre—romantic comedy films set in rural, especially Alpine, areas. She served as the inspiration for the female characters created by manga artist Leiji Matsumoto.

Biography 
Born Marianne Weiss in Johannisburg, East Prussia (today Pisz, Poland), Hold had to flee with her mother when World War II was drawing to a close, and they settled in Innsbruck. Her father did not return from the war. When her mother married again Hold, after disagreements with her stepfather, went to Rome, Italy, where she took various jobs. Her brother Siegfried Hold went on to become a cinematographer.

In 1950 she was offered her first big role by Luis Trenker, and starred with him in Barrier to the North. Her breakthrough role was in Die Fischerin vom Bodensee in 1956. Many more Heimatfilme followed.

While filming Mission to Hell (1964) Hold met Czech-born actor Friedrich Strobel von Stein, alias Frederick Stafford, and married him. Their son, Roderick Stafford, was born in the same year. Hold then retired from the movie business.

She died of a heart attack in Lugano, Switzerland.

Filmography

 Barrier to the North (1950)
 Holiday From Myself (1952)
 Ava Maria (1953)
Wedding Bells (1954)
Marianne of My Youth  (1955)
 Heimatland (1955)
 When the Alpine Roses Bloom (1955)
 Escape to the Dolomites (1955)
 Pulverschnee nach Übersee (1956)
 Die Fischerin vom Bodensee (1956)
 Like Once Lili Marleen  (1956)
  / Schicksal am Matterhorn (1956)
 Die Lindenwirtin vom Donaustrand (1957)
Die Prinzessin von St.Wolfgang (1957)
  (1957)
 Heimatlos (1958)
 Mein Schatz ist aus Tirol (1958)
 The Priest and the Girl (1958)
 Bei der blonden Kathrein (1959)
 Kein Mann zum Heiraten (1959)
 Do Not Send Your Wife to Italy  (1960)
 Sooo nicht, meine Herren! (1960)
 Schön ist die Liebe am Königssee (1960)
Isola Bella (1961)
Darling (1961)
Waldrausch (1962)
Wild Water (1962)
  Mission to Hell (1964)
  The Shoot  (1964)

References

External links
 
 Biographie (Sources: Munziger, Bild, BamS, Hoer Zu, Bildwoche)
 Biographie (Peter Hoffmann)

1933 births
1994 deaths
20th-century German actresses
German film actresses
People from Pisz
People from East Prussia